Elezović is a Yugoslavian surname. It may refer to:

Jovica Elezović (born 1956), former Yugoslav handball player
Uroš Elezović (born 1982), former Serbian handball player
Gligorije Elezović (1879—1960), Serbian historian
Pete Elezovic (born 1971), American football player

Serbian surnames
Croatian surnames
Bosnian surnames